San Francisco Ballet dances seasons each year at the War Memorial Opera House, San Francisco, California and tours.  All world premieres were performed by the San Francisco Ballet unless otherwise noted.

A 
 After the Rain
 Agon by George Balanchine
 World Premiere: December 12, 1957 - New York City Ballet, City Center of Music and Drama, New York, New York
 San Francisco Ballet Premiere (complete ballet): April 10, 1976 - Orpheum Theatre, San Francisco, California
 Alles Walzer (excerpt)
 World Premiere (complete ballet) 1997 - Vienna State Opera
 San Francisco Ballet Premiere: January 23, 2008<ref name=2015gala>Program notes in the Infinite Romance: San Francisco Ballet 2015 Opening Night Gala" booklet (2015)</ref>
 Artifact Suite B 
 Beaux Bells World Premiere: May 4, 2011 - Joffrey Ballet
 San Francisco Ballet Premiere: January 22, 2015
 Borderlands Borealis© World Premiere: January 22, 2015
 Brahms-Schoenberg Quartet by George Balanchine

 C 
 Caprice Carnival of the Animals The Chairman Dances by Benjamin Millepied
 World Premiere: January 19, 2017 - San Francisco Ballet 84th Anniversary Gala
 Chroma Cinderella by Christopher Wheeldon
 World Premiere: December 13, 2012 — Dutch National Ballet, Het Muziektheater; Amsterdam, Netherlands 
 U.S. Premiere: May 3, 2013
 A Cinderella Story World Premiere: October 20, 2004 - Royal Winnipeg Ballet
 San Francisco Ballet Premiere - January 22, 2015
 Classical Symphony Concerto Grosso World Premiere: January 29, 2003
 Coppélia Company B by Paul Taylor
 World Premiere (complete ballet): June 21, 1991 - Houston Ballet, Eisenhower Theatre, Kennedy Center for the Performing Arts, Washington, DC 
 San Francisco Ballet Premiere (complete ballet): February 3, 1993
 Criss-Cross D 
 Diamonds by George Balanchine
 from Jewels World Premiere (Jewels): April 13, 1967 — New York City Ballet, New York State Theater; New York, New York
 San Francisco Ballet Premiere: January 30, 1987
 Divertimento No. 15 Don Quixote E 
 Emeralds by George Balanchine
 from Jewels World Premiere (Jewels): April 13, 1967 — New York City Ballet, New York State Theater; New York, New York
 San Francisco Ballet Premiere: January 30, 1987

 F 
 Fearful Symmetries by Liam Scarlett
 World Premiere: January 27, 2016 
 The Fifth Season Filling Station Flames of Paris by Vasili Vainonen
 World Premiere (complete ballet Plamya Parizha): November 7, 1932 - Kirov Ballet, Kirov Theatre, Leningrad, Russia
 San Francisco Ballet Premiere: February 3, 1997
 Foragers by Myles Thatcher
World Premiere: November 15, 2016 - The Twelfth International Competition for the Erik Bruhn Prize, Four Seasons Centre for the Performing Arts, Toronto, Canada
 The Four Temperaments by George Balanchine
 Fragile Vessels by Jiří Bubeníček
 World Premiere: January 24, 2017 
 Francesca da Rimini Frankenstein by Liam Scarlett
 World Premiere: May 17, 2016 — The Royal Ballet, Royal Opera House, Covent Garden; London, UK 
 San Francisco Ballet Premiere: February 17, 2017
 From Foreign Lands Fusion by Yuri Possokhov
 World Premiere: April 22, 2008 

 G 
 Ghost in the Machine by Myles Thatcher
 World Premiere: April 5, 2017 
 Ghosts Giselle Glass Pieces Guide to Strange Places H 
 “Haffner” Symphony World Premiere: June 25, 1991

 I 
 Ibsen's House In The Countenance of Kings by Justin Peck
 World Premiere: April 7, 2016
 in the middle, somewhat elevated In the Night Imaginal Disc J 
 Jewels by George Balanchine
 Emeralds
 Rubies
 Diamonds
 World Premiere (Jewels): April 13, 1967 — New York City Ballet, New York State Theater; New York, New York
 San Francisco Ballet Premiere: January 30, 1987

 K 
 The Kingdom of the Shades from La Bayadère, Act II L 
 La Cathedrale Engloutie by Stanton Welch
 World Premiere: February 3, 1997, Davies Symphony Hall, San Francisco, California
 Le Corsaire World Premiere: January 25, 1899 - Maryinsky Theatre
 San Francisco Ballet Premiere: January 14, 1964
 The Little Mermaid M 
 Maelstrom N 
 Nanna's Lied Number Nine The Nutcracker O 
 On a Theme of Paganini World Premiere: March 7, 2008
 Onegin World Premiere: April 13, 1965 - Stuttgart Ballet
 San Francisco Ballet Premiere: January 27, 2012
 Optimistic Tragedy by Yuri Possokhov
 World Premiere: January 26, 2017
 Opus 19/The Dreamer P 
 Pas/Parts 2016 by William Forsythe
 World Premiere: March 31, 1999 — Paris Opéra Ballet, Palais Garnier; Paris, France 
 San Francisco Ballet Version Premiere: January 24, 2016
 Petrouchka Presentce by Trey McIntyre
 World Premiere: January 19, 2017 - San Francisco Ballet 84th Anniversary Gala
 Prism Prodigal Son by George Balanchine
 World Premiere: May 21, 1929 — Diaghilev’s Ballets Russes, Théàtre Sarah Bernhardt; Paris, France
 New York City Ballet Premiere: February 23, 1950 — City Center of Music and Drama; New York, New York
 San Francisco Ballet Premiere: March 27, 1984 
 Promenade Sentimentale by Liam Scarlett
 World Premiere: April 11, 2013 - K-Ballet, Bunkamura Orchard Hall, Tokyo, Japan
 San Francisco Ballet Premiere (pas de deux): January 19, 2017 - San Francisco Ballet 84th Anniversary Gala

 R 
 RAkU Raymonda - Act III The Rite of Spring Romeo † Juliet Rubies by George Balanchine
 from Jewels World Premiere (Jewels): April 13, 1967 — New York City Ballet, New York State Theater; New York, New York
 San Francisco Ballet Premiere: January 30, 1987
 Russian Seasons S 
 Salome by Arthur Pita
 World Premiere: March 9, 2017 
 Scotch Symphony by George Balanchine
 Serenade by George Balanchine
 Seven Sonatas by Alexei Ratmansky
 World Premiere: October 2, 2009 — American Ballet Theatre, Richard B. Fisher Center for the Performing Arts at Bard College; Annandale-on-Hudson, New York 
 San Francisco Ballet Premiere: April 5, 2016
 Shostakovich Trilogy Souvenir D'Un Lieu Cher World Premiere: February 16, 2012 - Dutch National Ballet
 San Francisco Ballet Premiere: January 22, 2015
 Stravinsky Violin Concerto by George Balanchine
 World Premiere: June 18, 1972 — New York City Ballet, New York State Theater; New York, New York
 San Francisco Ballet Premiere: March 28, 1995
 Suite en Blanc Swan Lake World Premiere: March 4, 1877 — Bolshoi Theatre; Moscow, Russia. Choreography by Julius Reisinger
 Premiere of the Petipa-Ivanov Production: February 8, 1895 — Mariinsky Theatre; St. Petersburg, Russia
 San Francisco Ballet Premiere: September 27, 1940 , Choreography by Willam Christensen
 Premiere of Current San Francisco Ballet Production: February 21, 2009
 Symphony in C Symphony in Three Movements Symphonic Dances Symphonic Variations T 
 Tears Terra Firma by James Kudelka
 World Premiere: February 16, 1995
 Theme and Variations by George Balanchine
 There Where She Loved World Premiere: Summer 2000 - The Royal Ballet
 San Francisco Ballet Premiere: August 28, 2003
 Trio  by Helgi Tomasson
 World Premiere: February 25, 2011

 U 
 Underskin V 
 Valses Poeticos by Helgi Tómasson
World Premiere: January 27, 1990

 The Vertiginous Thrill of Exactitude San Francisco Ballet Premiere: March 5, 1998

 W 
 Within the Golden Hour© by Christopher Wheeldon
 World Premiere: April 22, 2008
 Winter Dreams7
 7 for 8''

See also 
 List of San Francisco Ballet 2011 repertory

References

External links
 

San Francisco Ballet
Lists of ballets by company